The Moorish Science Temple of America is an American national and religious organization founded by Noble Drew Ali (born as Timothy Drew) in the early twentieth century. He based it on the premise that African Americans are descendants of the Moabites and thus are "Moorish" (sometimes also spelled "Muurish" by adherents) by nationality, and Islamic by faith. Ali put together elements of major traditions to develop a message of personal transformation through historical education, racial pride and spiritual uplift. His doctrine was also intended to provide African Americans with a sense of identity in the world and to promote civic involvement.

An organization with headquarters in Baltimore, Maryland, claiming to be "the ONLY Moorish Science Temple teaching the full National side of the Moorish Movement", is the Moorish Science Temple, with registered business names of the Divine and National Movement of North America, Inc., and Moorish American National Republic.

One primary tenet of the Moorish Science Temple is the belief that African Americans are of "Moorish" descent, specifically from the "Moroccan Empire". According to Ali, this area included other countries that today surround Morocco. To join the movement, individuals had to proclaim their "Moorish nationality". They were given "nationality cards". In religious texts, adherents refer to themselves racially as "Asiatics", as the Middle East is also western Asia. Adherents of this movement are known as "Moorish-American Moslems" and are called "Moorish Scientists" in some circles.

The Moorish Science Temple of America was incorporated under the Illinois Religious Corporation Act 805 ILCS 110. Timothy Drew, known to its members as Prophet Noble Drew Ali, founded the Moorish Science Temple of America in 1913 in Newark, New Jersey, a booming industrial city. After some difficulties, Ali moved to Chicago, establishing a center there, as well as temples in other major cities. The movement expanded rapidly during the late 1920s. The quick expansion of the Moorish Science Temple arose in large part from the search for identity and context among black Americans at the time of the Great Migration to northern and midwestern cities, as they were becoming an urbanized people.

Competing factions developed among the congregations and leaders, especially after the death of the charismatic Ali. Three independent organizations developed from this ferment. The founding of the Nation of Islam by Wallace Fard Muhammad in 1930 also created competition for members. In the 1930s membership was estimated at 30,000, with one third in Chicago. During the postwar years, the Moorish Science Temple of America continued to increase in membership, albeit at a slower rate.

Biography of Drew

Timothy Drew was believed to have been born on January 8, 1886, in North Carolina, United States. Sources differ as to his background and upbringing: one reports he was the son of two former slaves who was adopted by a tribe of Cherokee; another describes Drew as the son of a Moroccan Muslim father and a Cherokee mother. In 2014 an article in the online Journal of Race Ethnicity and Religion attempted to link Timothy Drew to one Thomas Drew, born January 8, 1886, using census records, a World War I draft card, and street directory records.

Founding of the Moorish Science Temple
Drew Ali reported that during his travels, he met with a high priest of Egyptian magic. In one version of Drew Ali's biography, the leader saw him as a reincarnation of the founder. In others, he says that the priest considered him a reincarnation of Jesus, the Buddha, Muhammad and other religious prophets. According to the biography, the high priest trained Ali in mysticism and gave him a "lost section" of the Quran.

This text came to be known as the Holy Koran of the Moorish Science Temple of America. It is also known as the "Circle Seven Koran" because of its cover, which features a red "7" surrounded by a blue circle. The first 19 chapters are from The Aquarian Gospel of Jesus the Christ, published in 1908 by esoteric Ohio preacher Levi Dowling. In The Aquarian Gospel, Dowling described Jesus' supposed travels in India, Egypt, and Palestine during the years of his life which are not accounted for by the New Testament.

Chapters 20 through 45 are borrowed from the Rosicrucian work, Unto Thee I Grant with minor changes in style and wording. They are instructions on how to live, and the education and duties of adherents.

Drew Ali wrote the last four chapters of the Circle Seven Koran himself. In these he wrote:

Drew Ali and his followers used this material to claim, "Jesus and his followers were Asiatic." ("Asiatic" was the term Drew Ali used for all dark or olive-colored people; he labeled all whites as European. He suggested that all Asiatics should be allied.)

Drew Ali crafted Moorish Science from a variety of sources, a "network of alternative spiritualities that focused on the power of the individual to bring about personal transformation through mystical knowledge of the divine within". In the inter-war years in Chicago and other major cities, he used these concepts to preach racial pride and uplift. His approach appealed to thousands of African Americans who had left severely oppressive conditions in the South through the Great Migration and faced struggles in new urban environments.

Practices and beliefs
Ali believed that African Americans are all Moors, who he claimed were descended from the ancient Moabites (the kingdom of which he says is now known as Morocco, as opposed to the ancient Canaanite kingdom of Moab, as the name suggests). This claim does not align with scientific studies of human history, such as the genetics of African-Americans and genetic history of sub-Saharan Africa. He claimed that Islam and its teachings are more beneficial to their earthly salvation, and that their "true nature" had been "withheld" from them. In the traditions he founded, male members of the Temple wear a fez or turban as head covering; women wear a turban.

They added the suffixes Bey or El to their surnames, to signify Moorish heritage as well as their taking on the new life as Moorish Americans. It was also a way to claim and proclaim a new identity over that lost to the enslavement of their ancestors. These suffixes were a sign to others that while one's African tribal name may never be known to them, European names given by their enslavers were not theirs, either.

As Drew Ali began his version of teaching the Moorish-Americans to become better citizens, he made speeches like, "A Divine Warning By the Prophet for the Nations", in which he urged them to reject derogatory labels, such as "Black", "colored", and "Negro". He urged Americans of all races to reject hate and embrace love. He believed that Chicago would become a second Mecca.

The ushers of the Temple wore black fezzes. The leader of a particular temple was known as a Grand Sheik, or Governor. Noble Drew Ali had several wives. According to The Chicago Defender, he claimed the power to marry and divorce at will.

History

Early history
In 1913, Drew Ali formed the Canaanite Temple in Newark, New Jersey. He left the city after agitating people with his views on race. Drew Ali and his followers migrated, while planting congregations in Philadelphia; Washington, D.C., and Detroit. Finally, Drew Ali settled in Chicago in 1925, saying the Midwest was "closer to Islam". The following year he officially registered Temple No. 9.

There he instructed followers not to be confrontational but to build up their people to be respected. In this way, they might take their place in the United States by developing a cultural identity that was congruent with Drew Ali's beliefs on personhood. In the late 1920s, journalists estimated the Moorish Science Temple had 35,000 members in 17 temples in cities across the Midwest and upper South. It was reportedly studied and watched by the Chicago police.

Building Moorish-American businesses was part of their program, and in that was similar to Marcus Garvey's Universal Negro Improvement Association and African Communities League and the later Nation of Islam. By 1928, members of the Moorish Science Temple of America had obtained some respectability within Chicago and Illinois, as they were featured prominently and favorably in the pages of The Chicago Defender, an African-American newspaper, and conspicuously collaborated with African American politician and businessman Daniel Jackson.

Drew Ali attended the January 1929 inauguration of Louis L. Emmerson, as 27th Governor of Illinois in the state capital of Springfield. The Chicago Defender stated that his trip included "interviews with many distinguished citizens from Chicago, who greeted him on every hand." With the growth in its population and membership, Chicago was established as the center of the movement.

Internal split and murder 
In early 1929, following a conflict over funds, Claude Green-Bey, the business manager of Chicago Temple No. 1 split from the Moorish Science Temple of America. He declared himself Grand Sheik and took a number of members with him. On March 15, Green-Bey was stabbed to death at the Unity Hall of the Moorish Science Temple, on Indiana Avenue in Chicago.

Drew Ali was out of town at the time, as he was dealing with former Supreme Grand Governor Lomax Bey (professor Ezaldine Muhammad), who had supported Green-Bey's attempted coup. When Drew Ali returned to Chicago, the police arrested him and other members of the community on suspicion of having instigated the killing. No indictment was sworn for Drew Ali at that time.

The death of Drew Ali
Shortly after his release by the police, Drew Ali died at age 43 at his home in Chicago on July 20, 1929. Although the exact circumstances of his death are unknown, the Certificate of Death stated that Noble Drew Ali died from "tuberculosis broncho-pneumonia". Despite the official report, many of his followers speculated that his death was caused by injuries from the police or from other members of the faith. Others thought it was due to pneumonia. One Moor told The Chicago Defender, "The Prophet was not ill; his work was done and he laid his head upon the lap of one of his followers and passed out."

Succession and schism

The death of Drew Ali brought out a number of candidates to succeed him. Brother Edward Mealy El stated that he had been declared Drew Ali's successor by Drew Ali himself. In August, within a month of Drew Ali's death, John Givens El, Drew Ali's chauffeur, declared that he was Drew Ali reincarnated. He is said to have fainted while working on Drew Ali's automobile and "the sign of the star and crescent [appeared] in his eyes".

At the September Unity Conference, Givens again made his claim of reincarnation. However, the governors of the Moorish Science Temple of America declared Charles Kirkman Bey to be the successor to Drew Ali and named him Grand Advisor.

With the support of several temples each, Mealy El and Givens El both went on to lead separate factions of the Moorish Science Temple. All three factions (Kirkman Bey, Mealy El, and Givens El) are active today.

On September 25, 1929, Kirkman Bey's wife reported to the Chicago police his apparent kidnapping by one Ira Johnson. Accompanied by two Moorish Science members, the police visited the home of Johnson, when they were met by gunfire. The attack escalated into a shoot-out that spilled into the surrounding neighborhood. In the end, a policeman as well as a member were killed in the gun battle, and a second policeman later died of his wounds. The police took 60 people into police custody, and a reported 1000 police officers patrolled the Chicago South Side that evening. Johnson and two others were later convicted of murder.

Kirkman Bey went on to serve as Grand Advisor of one of the most important factions until 1959, when the reins were given to F. Nelson-Bey.

Nation of Islam
The community was further split when Wallace Fard Muhammad, known within the temple as David Ford-el, also claimed (or was taken by some) to be the reincarnation of Drew Ali. When his leadership was rejected, Ford El broke away from the Moorish Science Temple. He moved to Detroit, where he formed his own group, an organization that would become the Nation of Islam. The Nation of Islam denied any historical connection with the Moorish Science Temple until February 26, 2014, when Louis Farrakhan acknowledged the contribution(s) of Noble Drew Ali to the Nation of Islam and their founding principles.

The 1930s
Despite the turmoil and defections, the movement continued to grow in the 1930s. It is estimated that membership in the 1930s reached 30,000. There were major congregations in Philadelphia, Detroit, and Chicago.

One-third of the members, or 10,000, lived in Chicago, the center of the movement. There were congregations in numerous other cities where African Americans had migrated in the early 20th century. The group published several magazines: one was the Moorish Guide National. During the 1930s and 1940s, continued surveillance by police (and later the FBI) caused the Moors to become more withdrawn and critical of the government.

FBI surveillance
During the 1940s, the Moorish Science Temple (specifically the Kirkman Bey faction) came to the attention of the FBI, who investigated claims of members committing subversive activities by adhering to and spreading of Japanese propaganda. The investigation failed to find any substantial evidence, and the investigations were dropped. The federal agency later investigated the organization in 1953 for violation of the Selective Service Act of 1948 and sedition. In September 1953, the Department of Justice determined that prosecution was not warranted for the alleged violations. The file that the FBI created on the temple grew to 3,117 pages during its lifetime. They never found any evidence of any connection or much sympathy of the temple's members for Japan.

El Rukn connection
In 1976 Jeff Fort, leader of Chicago's Black P Stone Nation, announced at his parole from prison in 1976 that he had converted to Islam. Moving to Milwaukee, Fort associated himself with the Moorish Science Temple of America. It is unclear whether he officially joined or was instead rejected by its members.

In 1978, Fort returned to Chicago and changed the name of his gang to El Rukn ("the foundation" in Arabic), also known as "Circle Seven El Rukn Moorish Science Temple of America" and the "Moorish Science Temple, El Rukn tribe". Scholars are divided over the nature of the relationship, if any, between El Rukn and the Moorish Science Temple of America. Fort reportedly hoped that an apparent affiliation with a religious organization would discourage law enforcement.

1980–2000s 

In 1984 the Chicago congregation bought a building from Buddhist monks in Ukrainian Village, which continues to be used for Temple No. 9. Demographic and cultural changes have decreased the attraction of young people to the Moorish Science Temple. Only about 200 members attended a convention in 2007, rather than the thousands of the past. In the early 2000s, the temples in Chicago, Philadelphia, Detroit, and Washington, D.C., had about 200 members each, and many were older people.

21st century
On July 15, 2019, Philadelphia mayor Jim Kenney, as part of a diversity program, proclaimed July 15 to be "Morocco Day". The city mistakenly invited members of the local Moorish Science temple to the ceremony, believing them to be of actual Moroccan descent.

Moorish sovereign citizens

During the 1990s, some former followers of the Moorish Science Temple of America and the Washitaw Nation formed an offshoot of the sovereign citizen movement which came to be known as Moorish sovereign citizens. Members believe the United States federal government to be illegitimate, which they attribute to a variety of factors including Reconstruction following the U.S. Civil War and the abandonment of the gold standard in the 1930s. The number of Moorish sovereign citizens is uncertain but possibly ranges between 3,000 and 6,000 organized mostly in small groups of several dozen.  Moorish sovereign citizens, who consider that black people constitute an elite class within American society, are in the paradoxical situation of using an ideology which originated in a white supremacist environment. 

In addition to the Moorish Science Temple doctrine that Black Americans are of Moorish descent, Moorish sovereign citizens claim immunity from U.S. federal, state, and local laws, because of a mistaken belief that the Moroccan–American Treaty of Friendship (1786) grants them sovereignty. In reality, the 1786 treaty was primarily a trade agreement.

Some also believe that Black Americans are indigenous to the United States. The Moorish sovereign citizen movement has also expanded to include a few whites.

The Southern Poverty Law Center classifies Moorish sovereign citizens as an extremist anti-government group. 
Tactics used by the group include filing false deeds and property claims, false liens against government officials, frivolous legal motions to overwhelm courts, and invented legalese used in court appearances and filings. Various groups and individuals identifying as Moorish sovereign citizens have used the unorthodox "quantum grammar" created by David Wynn Miller.
An article syndicated by the Associated Press states that the Temple has disavowed any affiliation with those responsible, calling them "radical and subversive fringe groups" and also states that "Moorish leaders are looking into legal remedies." The article also quotes an academic who has been advising authorities on how to distinguish registered Temple members from impostors in the sovereign citizen movement.

Legal incidents
Some "Moorish" activists have practiced hostile possession of properties, citing "reparations" as a justification for their actions, even though their victims included other Black Americans. In June 2021, Hubert A. John, a self-identified citizen of the Al Moroccan Empire, was arrested and charged on with counts of criminal mischief, burglary, criminal trespass and terroristic threats after he occupied a house in Newark, New Jersey, claiming that it fell into the jurisdiction of the Al Moroccan Empire.

In 2005, musician Roy "Future Man" Wooten pleaded guilty to income tax evasion, after having been indicted on charges in 2001 that he had not filed or paid taxes between 1995 and 1998. He was affiliated with the Washitaw Nation, and before his guilty plea had been judged possibly incapable of assisting in his own defense after filing incomprehensible sovereign citizen paperwork with the court.

In 2016, Washitaw Nation affiliate Gavin Eugene Long ambushed six police officers and killed three of them in Baton Rouge, Louisiana. Police killed Long in the resulting confrontation.

In July 2021, eleven men identifying themselves as a group called Rise of the Moors were arrested on Interstate 95 in Wakefield, Massachusetts, after a state trooper responding to disabled vehicles allegedly found the group carrying long guns, side-arms and wearing tactical body armor. Police said the group claimed to be traveling from Rhode Island to Maine for "training" on their privately owned land. An Instagram account belonging to the group says its goal is to continue the work of Noble Drew Ali.

A Rise of the Moors member had earlier been arrested in Danvers, Massachusetts, in 2019 on an outstanding warrant. He alleged his arrest was unlawful and filed a federal lawsuit against the police, which was dismissed after he tried to pay the court fees with a silver coin, saying U.S. currency was unconstitutional because it was "not backed by anything of value".

See also 

 Black Hebrew Israelites
 Five-Percent Nation
 Hoteps
 Moorish Orthodox Church of America, a splinter group

Citations

General references 

 Ali, Noble Prophet Drew (1928). Holy Koran of the Moorish Science Temple of America
 Abdat, Fathie Ali (2014). "Before the Fez- Life and Times of Drew Ali 1886-1924", Journal of Race, Ethnicity and Religion, 5: 1-39.
 Abu Shouk, Ahmed I. (1997). "A Sudanese Missionary to the United States", Sudanic Africa, 9:137–191.
 Ahlstrom, Sydney E. (2004). A Religious History of the American People, 2nd ed., Yale University Press, .
 Blakemore, Jerome; Yolanda Mayo; Glenda Blakemore (2006). "African-American and Other Street Gangs: A Quest of Identity (Revisted)", Human Behavior in the Social Environment from an African-American Perspective, Letha A. See, ed., The Haworth Press .
 Chicago Defender (1929). "Drew Ali, 'Prophet' of Moorish Cult, Dies Suddenly", July 27, 1929, page 1.
 Chicago Tribune (May 1929). "Cult Head Took Too Much Power, Witnesses Say", May 14, 1929.
 Chicago Tribune (September 1929). "Seize 60 After So. Side Cult Tragedy", September 26, 1929, p. 1.
 Gale Group, "Timothy Drew", Religious Leaders of America, 2nd ed., 1999, Biography Resource Center. Farmington Hills, Mich.: Thomson Gale, 2007.
 Gardell, Mattias (1996). In the Name of Elijah Muhammad. Duke University Press, .
 
 Gomez, Michael A. (2005). Black Crescent: The Experience and Legacy of African Muslims in the Americas, Cambridge University Press, .
 Hamm, Mark S. (2007). Terrorist Recruitment in American Correctional Institutions: An Exploratory Study of Non-Traditional Faith Groups Final Report, U.S. Department of Justice, December 2007, Document No.: 220957.
 The Hartford Courant (1930). "Religious Cult Head Sentenced For Murder", April 19, 1930, p. 20.
 Lippy, Charles H. (2006).  Faith in America: Changes, Challenges, New Directions, Praeger Publishers, .
 Main, Frank (2006). Chicago Sun-Times, June 25, 2006, p. A03.
 McCloud, Aminah (1994). African American Islam, Routledge.
 Miyakawa, Felicia M. (2005). Five Percenter Rap: God Hop's Music, Message, and Black Muslim Mission, Indiana University Press, Bloomington, Indiana, .
 Nance, Susan. (2002). "Respectability and Representation: The Moorish Science Temple, Morocco and Black Public Culture in 1920s Chicago", American Quarterly 54, no. 4 (December): 623–659.
 Nash, Jay Robert (1993). World Encyclopedia of Organized Crime, Da Capo Press, .
 Nashashibi, Rami (2007) "The Blackstone Legacy, Islam, and the Rise of Ghetto Cosmopolitanism", Souls, Volume 9, Issue April 2, 2007, pages 123–131.
 Paghdiwala, Tasneem (2007), "The Aging of the Moors", Chicago Reader, November 15, 2007, Vol 37 No 8.
 Perkins, William Eric (1996) Droppin' Science: Critical Essays on Rap Music and Hip Hop Culture, Temple University Press.
 Prashad, Vijay (2002). Everybody Was Kung Fu Fighting: Afro-Asian Connections and the Myth of Cultural Purity, Beacon Press, .
 Scopino, A. J. Jr. (2001). "Moorish Science Temple of America", in Organizing Black America: An Encyclopedia of African American Associations, Nina Mjagkij, ed., Garland Publishing, p. 346.
 Shipp, E. R. (1985). "Chicago Gang Sues to Be Recognized as Religion", The New York Times, December 27, 1985, p. A14.
 Turner, Richard Brent (2003). Islam in the African-American Experience, Indiana University Press, .
 The Washington Post (1929). "Three Deaths Laid to Fanatical Plot", September 27, 1929, p. 2.
 Wilson, Peter Lamborn (1993). Sacred Drift: Essays on the Margins of Islam, City Lights Books, .

External links
 Official website
 FBI on the Moorish Science Temple of America

 
1913 establishments in Illinois
African and Black nationalist organizations in North America
African-American Islam
African-American organizations
COINTELPRO targets
Cultural appropriation
Islamic organizations based in the United States
Nation of Islam
Pseudohistory
Religious corporations
Religious organizations established in 1913
Religious syncretism
Religious belief systems founded in the United States
Sovereign citizen movement